SOS Children's Villages UK, is an international children's charity based in Cambridge in the United Kingdom. It is part of the international federation SOS Children's Villages – the largest international charity dedicated to the care of children who have lost parental care.

Internationally, SOS Children's Villages works in 136 countries and territories, of which it provides services in 125. Its goal is to ensure that no child grows up alone. Programmes include Children's Villages where a child who has nobody to care for them, SOS Children's Villages offers them a family-like home in 550 SOS village communities around the world with dedicated SOS parents who give the children the individual care and attention they need, and SOS siblings to grow up with.  Family strengthening programmes where SOS Children's Villages works directly with families to provide practical and emotional support to help parents and caregivers look after their children. Youth employability and vocational training programmes to provide young people with the skills and confidence to build fulfilling careers and independent lives. In conflict zones and disaster-hit areas SOS Children's Villages provide children with specific protection and care utilising their global infrastructure. 

The charity is non-denominational and works in the spirit of the United Nations Convention on the Rights of the Child.

Since 1995, SOS Children's Villages has worked with the United Nations to help governments and organisations support children who have lost or are at risk of losing parental care. In 2009, the charity worked with other experts to develop the UN Guidelines for the Alternative Care of Children.

In 1969 chairman of SOS Children's Villages UK, Dickson Mabon attempted to arrange the construction of Children's Villages in Scotland. However, he was refused permission to build the Villages on planning grounds by the local authorities concerned.

Supporters and Ambassadors

Supporters include Stephen Hawking, Alexander McCall Smith, Anyika Onuora, Richard Attenborough, Kate Humble and Wayne Rooney.

International Ambassador, as of April 2014, is Belgian footballer Vincent Kompany.

Angelina Jolie is a long-term supporter and has visited SOS Children's Villages in Haiti, Ethiopia and Jordan.

Nelson Mandela was a supporter of SOS Children's Villages work in South Africa and officially opened the SOS Children's Village in Cape Town. Upon his death in December 2013, SOS Children's Villages joined in memorials to celebrate his life. The Dalai Lama supports SOS Children, particularly the SOS Children's Villages in North India, which provide a home for child refugees from Tibet.

Trustees

Current trustees are Harpinder Collacott (Chair), Graham Budd, Matthew de Villiers, Nicola Robert, Ian Briggs, Susie Hargreaves and Solava Ibrahim.

Previous Trustees have included George Windsor, Earl of St Andrews. Dame Mary Richardson is their President.

References

Development charities based in the United Kingdom
Charities based in Cambridgeshire
Children's charities based in the United Kingdom
SOS Children's Villages
Recipients of the Ahmadiyya Muslim Peace Prize